Tunbridge & Tunbridge is an architectural partnership in Townsville, Queensland, Australia. It consisted of Walter Howard Tunbridge and his brother Oliver Tunbridge. A number of their works are now heritage-listed.

History 
Walter Howard Tunbridge was born and trained in England as an architect. In 1884 he migrated to Australia and worked for Rooney Brothers in Townsville. He left to establish his own practice in 1886 and invited his younger brother, Oliver, to join him in 1887. This partnership subsequently became an important architectural and civil engineering firm in North Queensland.

Significant works 
 Victoria Park Hotel
 Bishop's Lodge

References

Attribution 

Architects from Queensland
Articles incorporating text from the Queensland Heritage Register
People from Townsville